Tarazan-e Olya (also Romanized as Ţarāzān-e ‘Olyā; also known as Ţarāzān-e Bālā) is a village in Kuhgir Rural District, Tarom Sofla District, Qazvin County, Qazvin Province, Iran. At the 2006 census, its population was 115, in 36 families.

References 

Populated places in Qazvin County